Nappy Creek is a stream in Nome Census Area, Alaska, in the United States.

Nappy Creek was likely named by prospectors in or before the year 1901.

See also
List of rivers of Alaska

References

Rivers of Nome Census Area, Alaska
Rivers of Alaska
Rivers of Unorganized Borough, Alaska
Rivers of the Seward Peninsula